The Lord Derby Challenge Trophy (Japanese ダービー卿チャレンジトロフィー) is a Grade 3 horse race for Thoroughbreds aged four and over, run in March over a distance of 1600 metres on turf at Nakayama Racecourse.

It was first run in 1969 and has held Grade 3 status since 1984. The race was run at Tokyo Racecourse until 1980 and was run over 1800 metres until 1979.

Winners since 2000

Earlier winners

 1984 - Tosho Pegasus
 1985 - Suzu Parade
 1986 - Suzu Parade
 1987 - Windstoss
 1988 - Windstoss
 1989 - Ivy Toko
 1990 - Yamano Tampopo
 1991 - Nice Power
 1992 - Tomoe Regent
 1993 - Tomoe Regent
 1994 - Sakura Bakushin O
 1995 - Ogi Tiffany
 1996 - Fujino Makken O
 1997 - Royal Suzuka
 1998 - Black Hawk
 1999 - Keiwan Viking

See also
 Horse racing in Japan
 List of Japanese flat horse races

References

Turf races in Japan